John Mark Cox Jr. was the first African American to attend Rollins College, Florida's oldest college.

In 1964, Cox was admitted to Rollins College, a liberal arts college in central Florida. He was the first African-American student admitted to the college during the Civil Rights Movement. At Rollins, Cox saw himself as a pioneer, beginning a new chapter in the history of the school, which was founded in 1885. Cox took a three-year break from Rollins in 1966, returning in 1969.

Cox is the son of a doctor who helped advance the Florida Southern Hospital to the top two out of fifteen in the Central Florida area. His mother, head of Economic Opportunity, Inc., ran 14 preschools for children from underprivileged backgrounds.  Cox had three younger siblings, all of whom attended school: his brother Alfred enrolled in Columbia Union College (now Washington Adventist University). Edith and Elaine were much younger than their brothers. After leaving Rollins, Cox started a family of his own.

Cox advocated for civil rights. In 1971, he made an address to a crowd on how happy he was to see formerly impossible developments become reality.

References
 Rollins College Online Records, "First African American student at Rollins College"
 Orlando Sentinel, September 25, 1966
 Tanner, Jo, Orlando Sentinel, Thursday April 8, 1971; "Black physician tells rotary members race relations consulting"

American civil rights activists
Living people
Rollins College alumni
Year of birth missing (living people)